Boiling Springs Historic District is a national historic district located at Boiling Springs, Cumberland County, Pennsylvania.  The district includes 127 contributing buildings, 1 contributing site, and 1 contributing structure associated with its role as an early iron manufacturing center and surrounding residential areas of Boiling Springs. Most of the contributing buildings date to the mid-19th century starting in 1845, with a few dated to the early period of development. The oldest buildings are a grist mill (c. 1750), the ironmaster's, Michael Ege, mansion (1795), and the restored Boiling Springs Tavern (1832). Other notable non-residential buildings include the former stone stables (1829) and forge building (1850s). Residential areas include notable examples of the Bungalow/craftsman, Late Victorian, and Federal styles.  The contributing structure is a stone three-arched bridge (1854).

It was added to the National Register of Historic Places in 1984.

Gallery

See also
 National Register of Historic Places listings in Cumberland County, Pennsylvania

References

External links
 

Federal architecture in Pennsylvania
Historic districts in Cumberland County, Pennsylvania
Historic districts on the National Register of Historic Places in Pennsylvania
National Register of Historic Places in Cumberland County, Pennsylvania